Stephen Amankona (born 30 March 2000) is a Ghanaian professional footballer who plays as a attacking midfielder and plays for Asante Kotoko SC. He was the captain of the Ghanaian Premier league side Berekum Chelsea.

Career 
Amankona scored a brace in a match against Eleven Wonders to help Berekum Chelsea to a 2–0 victory.

References

External links 
 
 

Living people
2000 births
Berekum Chelsea F.C. players
Ghana Premier League players
Ghanaian footballers
Association football forwards